Canal 10 is a nationwide terrestrial television channel from Nicaragua owned by Radio y Televisión de Nicaragua, S.A. (RATENSA), a company founded by Mexican investors.

RATENSA formerly owned Canal 4 and also owns a local network of four affiliated radio stations  Tropicálida, Alfa, Radio Galaxia La Picosa and Radio Joya.

History
The frequency was given to Carlos Reynaldo and César Augusto Lacayo, but was quickly bought by Ángel González. The channel's frequency was assigned in 1990, and upon Ángel González's control, he assigned Chicho Silva for the post.

The station initially carried exclusively foreign programming; a local newscast was added in August 2001.

On January 7, 2005, the channel fired its existing news team as its newscast (Telediario 10) was replaced by Acción 10, and its presenters didn't match the new newscast's profile.

On October 6, 2005, subscribers of the Estesa cable system (now Claro) got access to a 24/7 feed of the channel, with better image quality and 24/7 programming, after an agreement was signed between Estesa and Ratensa. A new agreement was signed in December with local cable operators, aiming to extend the signal to the entire country, including areas with no signal of the national channel of border areas where Costa Rican channels were dominant.

In August 2018, the channel's manager Carlos Pastora said that a boss from TN8 had forced him to regulate its newscasts and editorial decisions.

References

External links 
 

Television stations in Nicaragua
Spanish-language television stations
Television channels and stations established in 1997